Dennis Warrior (birth registered second ¼ 1922) is an English former professional rugby league footballer who played in the 1940s and 1950s.

Background
Dennis Warrior's birth was registered in Leeds district, West Riding of Yorkshire, England, he was a pupil at Burley National School (now Burley St. Matthias school), and in  the school rugby league team won the Goldthorpe Cup (named after Goldthorpe brothers; William Goldthorpe, James Goldthorpe, John Goldthorpe, Albert Goldthorpe, Walter Goldthorpe (father of association footballer (soccer), Ernest "Ernie" Goldthorpe)

Playing career

Club career
Dennis Warrior's career at Leeds was interrupted by World War II. In the 1948–49 season, he was transferred from Leeds to Bramley with Joseph "Joe" Hulme in a part-exchange for Robert "Bob" Bartlett and Dennis Murphy.

Testimonial match
Dennis Warrior's testimonial match took place at Bramley in 1955.

Genealogical information
Dennis Warrior's marriage to Mildred (née Fox) was registered in Leeds district during third ¼ 1945, the birth of their daughter Christine Warrior was registered in Leeds district during third ¼ 1946.

References

External links
Search for "Warrior" at rugbyleagueproject.org

Goldthorpe Cup

1922 births
Bramley RLFC players
Castleford Tigers players
English rugby league players
Leeds Rhinos players
Possibly living people
Rugby league players from Leeds
Rugby league centres